An aerial platform may refer to:

Aerial work platform, a mechanized access platform such as a "cherry picker" or a "scissor lift"
Platform truck, a special type of firefighting ladder truck